USS Memorable (AMc-89) was an Accentor-class coastal minesweeper acquired by the U.S. Navy for the dangerous task of removing mines from minefields laid in the water to prevent ships from passing.

Memorable was laid down by Fulton Shipyard, Antioch, California, 31 July 1941; launched 24 December 1941; sponsored by Mrs. Mary Shor; and placed in service 9 March 1942.

World War II service 

After training at Local Defense School, Treasure Island, California, Memorable departed San Francisco, California, 24 March 1942, for her home port of San Pedro, California. Assigned to the western sea frontier, she operated as a unit of the San Pedro Section, Naval Local Defense Forces, 11th Naval District.

Throughout World War II she ensured the safe passage of shipping in and out of Los Angeles Harbor.

Post-war inactivation and disposal 

At the end of the war she was placed out of service 7 December 1945. Struck from the Naval Register 3 January 1946, she was delivered to War Shipping Administration (WSA) 17 September 1948 and was subsequently sold.

References

External links 
 Dictionary of American Naval Fighting Ships
 NavSource Online: Mine Warfare Vessel Photo Archive - Memorable (AMc 89)

 

Accentor-class minesweepers
Ships built in Antioch, California
1941 ships
World War II minesweepers of the United States